Paraferrimonas haliotis is an iron-reducing, Gram-negative, facultatively anaerobic and stick-shaped bacterium from the genus of Paraferrimonas which has been isolated from the intestine tract of an abalone Haliotis discus.

References

External links
Type strain of Paraferrimonas haliotis at BacDive -  the Bacterial Diversity Metadatabase

Bacteria described in 2017
Alteromonadales